The 2022–23 UC Irvine Anteaters men's basketball team represented the University of California, Irvine in the 2022–23 NCAA Division I men's basketball season. They played their home games at the Bren Events Center in Irvine, California as a member of the Big West Conference. The Anteaters were led by 13th-year head coach Russell Turner.

Previous season

The Anteaters finished the 2021–22 season 15–10, 9–5 to finish in fourth place in Big West play. They lost to UC Santa Barbara in the quarterfinals of the Big West tournament. The team led the nation in three-point field goal defense, allowing opponents to shoot only 25.3%. They were 10th in the nation in overall field goal defense allowing opponents to shoot 38.4%

Roster

Source

Schedule and results

|-
!colspan=12 style=| Exhibition

|-
!colspan=12 style=| Non-conference regular season

|-
!colspan=12 style=| Big West regular season

|-
!colspan=12 style=| Big West tournament

|-
!colspan=12 style=| National Invitational Tournament

|-

Source

References

UC Irvine Anteaters men's basketball seasons
UC Irvine
UC Irvine
UC Irvine
UC Irvine